Puddle Cruiser is a 1996 American comedy film, the first full-length film created by the Broken Lizard comedy group.  It premiered at the Sundance Film Festival. The movie was filmed entirely on the campus of Colgate University, the alma mater of all five members of the comedy quintet. It was released on DVD in December 2005; the disc also features a 17-minute documentary called Rodeo Clowns on the marketing of Puddle Cruiser and Super Troopers with free previews on college campuses and using specially-painted tour buses. The extras and actors are almost entirely friends, family and other alumni, due to the very tight budget of the film. The film is repeatedly shown on Comedy Central.

Plot
While breaking in to the Coburn University dining hall, college friends Felix, (Steve Lemme), Matt (Paul Soter), and Grogan (Kevin Heffernan) are discovered by campus police.  Felix manages to escape, but Matt and Grogan are caught, and await a disciplinary trial.  Felix meets Suzanne (Kayren Butler), the student lawyer assigned to his friend's case, and begins a casual relationship with her. Suzanne is still dating her boyfriend, Traci (Jamison Selby), who is a rugby player at another school.  Suzanne attempts to hide her relationship with Felix from Traci, causing Felix to sleep with Jennifer (Laura Arieh), another student.  Suzanne becomes angry with Felix for pursuing another woman, while he insists that she is hypocritical, as she is still dating Traci.  Matt and Grogan inform Suzanne that Felix was with them on the night they were caught breaking into the dining hall, forcing her to resign from the case, causing a guilty verdict and a community service sentence.  Suzanne breaks up with Traci, only to find that he is scheduled to play against the Coburn rugby team. Suzanne begs Felix not to play in the upcoming game for his own safety and attempts to have him removed from the game by reporting his crime to campus police. The attempt is foiled when the players from both teams parody the climactic scene from Spartacus ("I'm Felix Bean!"). He succeeds in playing but is significantly injured by Traci who single-mindedly pursued him for the entire match. He is sentenced to community service during his recovery from the injuries.  Felix and Suzanne admit that they love each other, as Felix begins carrying out his community service. Meanwhile, Matt, Grogan, and Freaky Reaky (Erik Stolhanske) are caught later that night stealing food from the kitchen.

Cast
 Steve Lemme as Felix Bean
 Jay Chandrasekhar as Zach Strader
 Paul Soter as Matthew "Matt" Phister
 Kevin Heffernan as Bartholomew Grogan
 Erik Stolhanske as Sean "Freaky Reaky" Reaker
 Alison Clapp as Emily Cooper
 Kayren Butler as Suzanne McKenna
 Jamison Selby as Traci Shannon
 Laura Arieh as Jennifer Montgomery

Accolades
It won the 1996 Golden Starfish Award at the 1996 Hamptons International Film Festival where it received a positive review from Variety (magazine) and split the award with Matt Mahurin's Mugshot.

References

Notes

External links 

1996 films
1996 comedy films
American comedy films
20th Century Fox films
Broken Lizard
Films directed by Jay Chandrasekhar
1996 directorial debut films
1990s English-language films
1990s American films